The office of Mayor of Cambridge was created following the granting of a charter by King John in 1207 to the town of Cambridge, Cambridgeshire, England. The charter gave the burgesses of the town the right to elect their own mayors in place of the provosts previously appointed by the crown. The first recorded mayor was Hervey FitzEustace who served in the year 1213.

Mayors of Cambridge
The following have been mayors of Cambridge :

1213: Hervey FitzEustace, 1st recorded mayor
1376–78: John Cotton, MP for Cambridge 6 times between 1379 and 1388
Sept. 1378-9, 1386-8, 1393-4, 1396-9, 1405-6: Robert Brigham
1391–92: John Marshall
1432–33: John Knapton
1586–87: John Edmonds, MP for Cambridge, 1586 
1596–98: Robert Wallis, MP for Cambridge, 1597–1611
1599–1600: John Yaxley, MP for Cambridge, 1597–1611 
1605–06: John Edmonds
1619–21: Richard Foxton, MP for Cambridge, 1621
c.1780: John Mortlock, MP for Cambridge, 1784
1794: John Whittred, magistrate (1697-1778)

19th century

20th century

21st century

References

Further reading
 

Cambridge
History of Cambridge
Cambridge-related lists